Haven is a town in the Wimmera region of Victoria, Australia about 5 km south of Horsham.  At the 2021 census, it had a population of 1,443.

Haven has a general store, a recreation reserve and a small primary school with approximately 100-150 students.  The town has a monthly market. Haven Post Office opened on 1 December 1911 and closed in 1985.

During the Black Saturday bushfires in February 2009, a fire enveloping the outskirts of Horsham threatened Haven; firefighters managed to save the general store, hall and school, despite flames coming within metres of those buildings.

References

Towns in Victoria (Australia)
Rural City of Horsham
Wimmera